Balatonakarattya is a village in Veszprém county, Hungary, established from the area of the town of Balatonkenese in 2014.

People 
 János Kodolányi

References

External links 
 

Populated places in Veszprém County
Shtetls